Masood Parvez (1918  10 March 2001), also spelled as Masud Pervaiz, was a Pakistani film director known for his work in Lollywood. He also worked in Indian films before partition of India and after migrating to Pakistan, he produced most of his work in Pakistani films where he made his directorial debut with Beli (1950).

Beli (1950) was the first film of Sabiha Khanum and Santosh Kumar besides being directorial debut of Parvez. The film flopped at the box office due to political instabilities caused by the partition. It was also the debut film of Rashid Attre in Pakistan.

Biography 
A relative of Saadat Hasan Manto, maternal uncle, Parvez was born in Amritsar, British India in 1918. Following the partition of the Indian subcontinent, he migrated to Pakistan.

He obtained his Master of Science in Physics from the Government College, Lahore (in modern-day the Government College University, Lahore). He wanted to obtain doctorate degree in Germany, but his maternal uncle Saadat Hasan Manto asked him to change his plan and he subsequently joined with Manto in Bombay where he worked in a number of films. After partition, he settled in Lahore, Pakistan where he directed and produced Urdu and Punjabi films, including Heer Ranjha.

Death
Masood Parvez died in Lahore on 10 March 2001.

Awards and recognition
 2 Nigar Awards as 'Best Director' for Punjabi film Heer Ranjha (1970) and then Khak Aur Khoon (1979).

Filmography

References

External links 
 

1918 births
2001 deaths
Muhajir people
Government College University, Lahore alumni
Film directors from Lahore
Urdu-language film directors
Pakistani film directors
Nigar Award winners